The following elections occurred in 1967.

 1967 Dutch general election
 1967 Icelandic parliamentary election
 1967 Liberian general election
 1967 Mauritian general election
 1967 Nicaraguan general election
 1967 Norwegian local elections
 1967 Philippine Senate election
 1967 Salvadoran presidential election
 1967 Sierra Leonean general election
 1967 Swazi parliamentary election

Africa
 1967 Democratic Republic of the Congo constitutional referendum
 1967 Gabonese general election

Asia
 1967 Iranian legislative election
 1967 Kuwaiti general election
 1967 North Korean parliamentary election

India
 1967 Indian general election
 1951–1971 Indian general elections
 Indian general election in Andhra Pradesh, 1967
 Indian general election in Madras, 1967
 1967 Indian presidential election
 1967 Madras State legislative assembly election

Australia
 1967 Australian Senate election
 1967 Mount Marshall state by-election
 1967 Australian referendum
 1967 Roe state by-election

Europe
 1967 Gibraltar sovereignty referendum

France
 1967 French cantonal elections
 1967 French legislative election

Germany
 1967 Rhineland-Palatinate state election

United Kingdom
 1967 Cambridge by-election
 1967 West Derbyshire by-election
 1967 Greater London Council election
 1967 Hamilton by-election
 1967 Honiton by-election
 1967 Liberal Party leadership election
 1967 Rhondda West by-election
 1967 Walthamstow West by-election

North America

Canada
 1967 Alberta general election
 1967 New Brunswick general election
 1967 Northwest Territories general election
 1967 Nova Scotia general election
 1967 Ontario general election
 1967 Progressive Conservative leadership election
 1967 Saskatchewan general election
 1967 Yukon general election

Caribbean
 1967 Jamaican general election

Mexico
 1967 Mexican legislative election

United States
 1967 Louisiana gubernatorial election

Oceania

Australia
 1967 Australian Senate election
 1967 Mount Marshall state by-election
 1967 Australian referendum
 1967 Roe state by-election

See also

 
1967
Elections